Igor Ribeiro Marcondes (born 16 June 1997) is an inactive Brazilian tennis player.

Marcondes has a career high ATP singles ranking of 258 achieved on 21 March 2022. He also has a career high ATP doubles ranking of 351 achieved on 17 January 2022.

Marcondes made his ATP main draw debut at the 2019 Brasil Open in the doubles draw partnering Rafael Matos.

Challenger and Futures finals

Singles: 4 (2–2)

References

External links
 
 

1997 births
Living people
Brazilian male tennis players
People from São José dos Campos
Doping cases in tennis
Sportspeople from São Paulo (state)
20th-century Brazilian people
21st-century Brazilian people